The Yandi mine is an iron ore mine located in the Pilbara region of Western Australia, 90 kilometres north-west of Newman. It should not be confused with Rio Tinto's nearby Yandicoogina mine, which is also sometimes shortened to Yandi. 

The mine is majority-owned (85 percent) and operated by BHP. As of 2021 the mine has commenced its end-of-life ramp-down, but is still used to provide supply chain flexibility at a lower level of production. 

The company also operates two port facilities at Port Hedland, Nelson Point and Finucane Island, and over 1,000 kilometres of rail in the Pilbara.

As of 2009 BHP Billiton is the second-largest iron ore mining company in the Pilbara, behind Rio Tinto and ahead of Fortescue Metals Group. As of 2010, BHP employs 8,000 people in its Pilbara operations.

Overview

The first iron ore mine in the Pilbara to develop was the Goldsworthy mine in 1965 and a railway line, the Goldsworthy railway, as well as port facilities at Finucane Island were constructed. On 1 June 1966, the first shipment of iron ore from the Pilbara left on board of Harvey S. Mudd.

Operations at Yandi commenced in 1991, with the first ore shipment taking place in 1992. The plant was upgraded from 1994 to 2003 to its current capacity of 41 million tonnes annually. The mine consists of  3 processing plants and two train loading facilities.

Mining operations within BHP throughout the Pilbara were briefly suspended in September 2008 to focus on safety after two fatalities at the Yandi mine within 10 days of each other.

References

Iron ore mines in Western Australia
Surface mines in Australia
Shire of East Pilbara
BHP
Itochu
1991 establishments in Australia